A secretarial pool or typing pool is a group of secretaries working at a company available to assist any executive without a permanently assigned secretary. These groups have been reduced or eliminated where executives have been assigned responsibility for writing their own letters and other secretarial work.

After the widespread adoption of the typewriter but before the photocopier and personal computer, pools of typists were needed by large companies to produce documents from handwritten manuscripts, re-type documents that had been edited, type documents from audio recordings, or to type copies of documents.

See also
Hot desking
Temporary work
Copy typist
Audio typist

References
"A Sea Change in the Secretarial Pool: Clerical Ranks Shrink as the Jobs Evolve", Michael A. Fletcher, Washington Post, May 11, 2000.

Office and administrative support occupations

de:Schreibbüro